Motosawa Dam is an earthfill dam located in Yamagata Prefecture in Japan. The dam is used for irrigation. The catchment area of the dam is 19.6 km2. The dam impounds about 2  ha of land when full and can store 157 thousand cubic meters of water. The construction of the dam was started on 1991 and completed in 2004.

References

Dams in Yamagata Prefecture
2004 establishments in Japan